The Zymagotitz River is a tributary of the Skeena River located in the North Coast Regional District of the province of British Columbia, Canada.

The Zymagotitz River's watershed is within the traditional territory of the Tsimshian Kitsumkalum people. Part of the watershed is currently under negotiation for aboriginal title according to the British Columbia Treaty Process, under which the Kitsumkalum First Nation is in the fifth of six stages.

Geography
The Zymagotitz River originates in high, glaciated peaks of the Kitimat Range, such as Mount William Brown, Mount Morris, Mount Kenney, Alice Peak, Mount Treston, Mount Remo, and Sleeping Beauty Mountain. The river flows south, passing by passing by Kitsumkalum Mountain, to the Skeena River, collecting a number of tributary streams including Erlandsen Creek and Molybdenum Creek.

Sleeping Beauty Mountain Provincial Park is located within the Zymagotitz River's watershed, as is part of Kitsumkalum Provincial Park.

The Zymagotitz River's watershed's land cover is classified as 37.7% Coniferous, 25.1% Barren, 14.8% Snow/Glacier, 9.9% Herb, and 8.1% Shrub.

The Indian reserve Zimagord 3, of the Kitsumkalum First Nation, is located near the mouth of the Zymagotitz River.

Natural history
The Zymagotitz River supports of runs of salmonids including Chinook salmon, chum salmon, coho salmon, pink salmon, and steelhead trout. Much of the Zymagotitz River's watershed has been subject to logging since the 1950s, including extensive clearcutting starting in the 1970s.

See also
List of British Columbia rivers

References 

Regional District of Kitimat–Stikine
Rivers of British Columbia
Rivers of the Kitimat Ranges
Rivers of the North Coast of British Columbia
Skeena Country
Tsimshian